The Omloop van Midden-Vlaanderen was a men's cycling race organized for the last time in 1976. The start and finish place was Deinze (East Flanders, Belgium).

The competition's roll of honor includes the successes of Patrick Sercu and Freddy Maertens.

Winners

References

Cycle races in Belgium
1936 establishments in Belgium
Defunct cycling races in Belgium
Recurring sporting events established in 1936
Recurring sporting events disestablished in 1976
1976 disestablishments in Belgium